The Barbados national badminton team represents Barbados in international badminton team competitions. The national team is managed by the Barbados Badminton Association in Bridgetown. Barbados have never medaled at the Pan American Badminton Championships.

The Barbadian mixed team started participating in the Commonwealth Games mixed team event since 2010.

Participation in Pan American Badminton Championships

Men's team

Women's team

Mixed team

Participation in Commonwealth Games 
Mixed team

Current squad 

Men
Kennie King
Shae Martin
Ziyad Mehter
Women
Tamisha Williams
Sabrina Scott
Eboni Atherley

References 

Badminton
National badminton teams
Badminton in Barbados